Black Musa (Turkish: Zenci Musa) or Sudanese Negro Musa (1880–1919) was a member of the Special Organization and a volunteer soldier in the Ottoman Empire; he participated in every war involving the empire from the Italo-Turkish War to World War I. He is known as Kuşcubaşı Eşref's aide and amir. Musa was seen as one of the faces of anti-colonialism in the Ottoman Empire, and was renowned for his loyalty to the state.

Life 
Black Musa was born in Crete in 1880. He was originally from Sudan. Upon his father's death, who he was living with in Crete, he moved to Cairo with his grandfather, who was an Ottoman enthusiast, and grew up in a neighborhood with Turks. Musa became fluent in Turkish while living in this neighborhood. He voluntarily participated in the Italo-Turkish War with his grandfather in 1911. While in Tripolitania, he met Kuşçubaşı Eşref, who came to Libya to galvanize the local people against the Italians, and became his amir. After the Italo-Turkish War, he participated in the Balkan Wars, the Sinai-Palestine Campaign, the Campaign in South Arabia during World War I, the Gallipoli Campaign, and the Raid on the Suez Canal. According to Kurdish–Turkish historian Cemal Kutay, during the occupation of Istanbul, a British Army general, Charles Harington, offered gold to lure Musa to the side of the British, but Musa did not accept it. He carried out both armed struggles and intelligence activities in the wars he participated in. He died of tuberculosis in 1919 while living in Üsküdar Şeyh Ata Efendi's Özbekler Lodge.  His body was buried in the cemetery next to the Özbekler Lodge. Since the burial place still remains undiscovered, an epitaph was built in his memory in a designated place in the cemetery.

In popular culture 
Famed poet, writer, academic, politician, and the author of the Turkish National Anthem, Mehmet Âkif Ersoy, met Black Musa, who was with Eşref Bey, in 1915 during his trip to Arabia. Ersoy later wrote the following lines of poetry about Black Musa:

References 

1880 births
1919 deaths
Members of the Special Organization (Ottoman Empire)
Ottoman military personnel of the Balkan Wars
Ottoman military personnel of the Italo-Turkish War
Ottoman Army personnel
Ottoman military personnel of World War I
Tuberculosis deaths in the Ottoman Empire
Tuberculosis deaths in Turkey
20th-century deaths from tuberculosis